Viktor Konoplyov (Polevoy) (born 1 June 1938) is a retired Soviet freestyle swimmer who won a gold and a silver medal in the 4×100 m medley relay at the European championships of 1958 and 1962. Between 1958 and 1962 he set four European records in the 4×100 m medley and freestyle relays. He won the national titles in the 100 m freestyle (1961–1963) and 4×100 m medley (1960).

He graduated from the State Central Order of Lenin Institute of Physical Education in Moscow, and after retirement worked as a national swimming coach and associated professor at various universities. He was one of the first Soviet swimmers to develop an optimal turning technique in freestyle. He holds a PhD in pedagogy and was awarded the Medal "Veteran of Labour".

References

1938 births
Living people
Swimmers from Moscow
Soviet male freestyle swimmers
Russian male freestyle swimmers
European Aquatics Championships medalists in swimming